Miyagino Nishikinosuke (宮城野 錦之助, 1744 – July 18, 1798) was a Japanese sumo wrestler. His highest rank was sekiwake. He was an active top makuuchi division wrestler at the age of 52, which is the all-time recognized record.

Career
His shikona was named after Miyagino because he worked under the Sendai Domain.  He made his debut in October 1766. He was promoted to the top makuuchi division in March 1781. He was demoted to jūryō in November 1794, but returned to makuuchi in March 1796 at the age of 52. After that tournament, he retired. His relatively uninterrupted career lasted 30 years, a record broken only in 2016 by Hanakaze and Hokutōryū , who both made their debuts in 1986. 

After retiring, he became a toshiyori (or sumo elder), but died only two years later. The modern Miyagino stable was named after him and he is regarded as the first Miyagino oyakata.

Top Division Record
The actual time the tournaments were held during the year in this period often varied.

See also
Glossary of sumo terms
List of past sumo wrestlers

References

1744 births
1798 deaths
Japanese sumo wrestlers
Sumo people from Iwate Prefecture
Sekiwake